Mitt decennium is the first track on Magnus Ugglas 1993 album  Alla får påsar. The song's lyrics describes the situation in early 1990s Sweden following the financial crash. While many in Sweden were looking backwards to the mid-late 1980s successful financial situations in Sweden, Magnus Uggla sings in the chorus that looking backwards is no use, instead he looks to the future. After all, he is in "his" own decade. A music video was subsequently released for the song.

Magnus Uggla himself has referred to the melody as one of his and Anders Henriksson’s better compositions.

The song became a Trackslistan success, charting for 17 weeks.

References 

1993 songs
1994 singles
Songs written by Magnus Uggla
Magnus Uggla songs
Swedish-language songs
Songs written by Anders Henriksson (record producer)